Maoz Haim (lit. Haim's Fortress) is a kibbutz in Israel. Located adjacent to the Jordan River in the Beit She'an valley and falls under the jurisdiction of Valley of Springs Regional Council. Aside from agriculture, the kibbutz also has a plastics factory, "Poliraz".

History
The kibbutz was established in 1937 by immigrants from Poland and Germany and was named after Haim Shturman, a member of the Hagana, who was killed there in 1938.

Maoz Haim was established on what was traditionally land belonging to the Palestinian village of Al-Ghazzawiyya.

Landmarks

Zakum nature reserve
South of the kibbutz is a small (11 dunam) nature reserve of Balanites aegyptiaca trees, called the Hurshat Zakum (Maoz Haim) reserve, declared in 1968. Zakum is the Hebrew name of the tree. This is probably the northernmost occurrence of these trees in the world.

Maoz Haim Synagogue
A 3rd century synagogue  was discovered in February 1974 during construction work near Maoz Haim. It is an unusual archaeological find in that it attests to a record of synagogue development from a time of otherwise sparse historiography, in times of anti-Judaic legislation. It is situated in a large settlement where it served as a center of worship for Jews until destruction by fire sometime in the early 7th century.

Notable people

 Dvora Omer (born 1932), author
 Ilan Shiloah (born 1957), businessman

Gallery

References

External links
Official website

German-Jewish culture in Israel
Kibbutzim
Kibbutz Movement
Populated places established in 1937
Nature reserves in Israel
Populated places in Northern District (Israel)
Polish-Jewish culture in Israel
1937 establishments in Mandatory Palestine